Trpimirović dynasty was a native Croatian dynasty that ruled in the Duchy and later the Kingdom of Croatia, with interruptions by the Domagojević dynasty from 845 until 1091. It was named after Trpimir I, the first member and founder. The most prominent rulers of the Trpimirović Dynasty include Tomislav (first king of Croatia), Petar Krešimir IV and Demetrius Zvonimir. The house gave four dukes, thirteen kings and a queen.

Since its mid-9th century foundation, the house reached independent rule at some later point and dissolved at the end of 11th century. During that time, the state had slight territorial changes, most notably in Bosnia and southern Dalmatia, where the wars against Venetians and others were waged.

Dukes and Kings of Croatia 
The Trpimirović dynasty was a ruling dynasty of Croatia from the 9th to the 11th century. The ruling estate of the Trpimirović dynasty was located in the area between Trogir and Split (today Kaštela, Solin area and Klis from where they ruled), and Split and Omiš and later in other parts of the land.

After the death of Duke Trpimir I, the power was temporarily assumed by Domagoj, a member of the Domagojević dynasty (most likely). In 878, Trpimir I's son Zdeslav overthrew Domagoj, and then around 892, Zdeslav's brother Muncimir became duke.

The rulers of the dynasty initially ruled as vassals of the Franks. They fought with the Venetian Republic and Byzantine Empire for control of the coast, and at the end of the 9th century achieved greater autonomy.

In the first half of the 10th century, the first King of Croatia, Tomislav united Lower Pannonia ("Pannonian Croatia") and Dalmatian Croatia and created the Kingdom of Croatia. According to scarce and disputed historical sources, Croatia was a powerful state under his rule. King Tomislav maintained an alliance with the pope and successfully defended Croatia from the invading Hungarians, while at the local level he participated at the Church Councils of Split in 925 and 928. The struggle with the Byzantines and the Venetians over Dalmatian coastal cities continued after his death.

Tomislav's successors failed to maintain a stable kingship and the country was affected by a dynastic crisis in the middle of the 10th century. Even Pribina, the Croatian ban (viceroy), got involved in the dispute between brothers Miroslav and Michael Krešimir II. Pribina took the side of Michael Krešimir which resulted in the murder of King Miroslav in 949.

Political and social recovery of Croatia occurred during the reign of King Stephen Držislav. Split chronicler Thomas the Archdeacon (1200–1268) wrote that Stephen Držislav had received royal honours and that since then, Croatian rulers were verifiably referred to as the "Kings of Dalmatia and Croatia".

After the death of King Stephen Držislav in 997, he was succeeded by three sons: Svetoslav Suronja, Krešimir III and Gojslav. The two younger brothers rebelled against Svetoslav Suronja, which started a new dynastic conflict that ended with the dethroning of Svetoslav. On thus the rulership was jointly taken over by Krešimir III and Gojslav. From Svetoslav and his offspring the Svetoslavić branch was created. The descendants of Krešimir III were part of the Krešimirović branch that continued to rule Croatia.

The dynasty reached its peak during the reign of King Petar Krešimir IV, who consolidated and expanded the kingdom.

The dynasty ended in 1091 with the death of Petar Krešimir IV's nephew Stephen II, the successor to King Demetrius Zvonimir who did not leave a male heir.

Rulers

Dukes of Croatia 
 Trpimir I (845–864)
 Zdeslav (878–879)
 Muncimir (892–910)
 Tomislav (910–925)

Kings of Croatia 
 Tomislav (925–928)
 Trpimir II (928–935)
 Krešimir I (935–945)
 Miroslav (945–949)
 Michael Krešimir II (949–969)
 Stephen Držislav (969–997)
 Svetoslav Suronja (997–1000)
 Krešimir III (1000–c. 1030)
 Gojslav (1000–c. 1020)
 Stephen I (c. 1030–1058)
 Peter Krešimir IV (1058–1074)
 Demetrius Zvonimir (1075–1089)
 Stephen II (1089–1091)

See also 
 List of rulers of Croatia
 History of Croatia
 House of Domagojević
 Trpimirović Royal Family Tree

References 
 Hrvatski leksikon (1997, A-Ž, 2 volume, in Croatian

External links 
 The Earliest Croatian Dukes and Kings

 
Medieval Croatian nobility
Kings of Croatia
Croatian royal families
History of Dalmatia